Village of Euclid v. Ambler Realty Co., 272 U.S. 365 (1926), more commonly known as Euclid v. Ambler, was a United States Supreme Court landmark case argued in 1926. It was the first significant case regarding the relatively new practice of zoning. The Supreme Court's finding that local ordinance zoning was a valid exercise of the police power bolstered zoning in the United States and influenced other countries.

Facts
Ambler Realty owned  of land in the village of Euclid, Ohio, a suburb of Cleveland. The village, in an attempt to prevent industrial Cleveland from growing into and subsuming Euclid and prevent the growth of industry which might change the character of the village, developed a zoning ordinance based upon six classes of use, three classes of height and four classes of area. The property in question was divided into three use classes, as well as various height and area classes, thereby hindering Ambler Realty from developing the land for industry. Ambler Realty sued the village, arguing that the zoning ordinance had substantially reduced the value of the land by limiting its use, amounting to a deprivation of Ambler's liberty and property without due process.

Judgment

Lower court
In the lower court, the village moved to dismiss the complaint entirely, arguing that Ambler Realty had no right to sue in the first place without taking the issue before the Euclid Zoning Board, as required by the zoning ordinance. Euclid was basing this argument on a legal doctrine which has come to be known as the exhaustion of administrative remedies. The court denied this motion. Finding that the zoning ordinance did in fact constitute a taking by Euclid of Ambler's property, the court stated that the ordinance was unconstitutional. The ordinance defined the use and size of buildings permissible in each district. Ambler Realty's land spanned multiple districts, and the company was therefore significantly restricted in the types of buildings it could construct on the land.  Thus there was no reason for the company to abide by the ordinance's requirement. Euclid's motion was denied and the lower court decided in favor of Ambler Realty. Prominent lawyer Newton D. Baker argued the case for Ambler Realty and James Metzenbaum represented Euclid.

Supreme Court
The Supreme Court agreed with the lower court's denial of the dismissal motion, but overturned the outcome of the case and sided with the Village of Euclid. The Court held that the zoning ordinance was not an unreasonable extension of the village's police power and did not have the character of arbitrary fiat, and thus it was not unconstitutional.

Further, the Court found that Ambler Realty had offered no evidence that the ordinance had any effect on the value of the property in question, but based their assertions of depreciation on speculation only. The court ruled that speculation was not a valid basis for a claim of takings.

Ambler Realty had argued their case on the basis of the 14th Amendment's due process clause. The Court noted that the challenger in a due process case would have to show that the law in question is discriminatory and has no rational basis. The Court found that Euclid's zoning ordinance in fact did have a rational basis.

Planner and lawyer Alfred Bettman, supported by the Ohio Planning Conference (now APA-Ohio, a chapter of the American Planning Association), submitted a friend of the court brief on behalf of Euclid, arguing that zoning is a form of nuisance control and therefore a reasonable police power measure.

In short the court ruled that zoning ordinances, regulations and laws must find their justification in some aspect of police power and asserted for the public welfare. Benefit for the public welfare must be determined in connection with the circumstances, the conditions and the locality of the case.

Significance

Zoning precedent

At the time of Euclid, zoning was a relatively new concept, and indeed there had been rumblings that it was an unreasonable intrusion into private property rights for a government to restrict how an owner might use property. The court, in holding that there was valid government interest in maintaining the character of a neighborhood and in regulating where certain land uses should occur, allowed for the subsequent explosion in zoning ordinances across the country. The court has never heard a case seeking to overturn Euclid. Today most local governments in the United States have zoning ordinances. The city of Houston, Texas, is the largest unzoned city in the United States.

Less than two years later, the Supreme Court decided Nectow v. City of Cambridge (1928). In Nectow, the Court overturned a zoning ordinance for violating the 14th Amendment due process clause.

Euclid
The Ambler tract remained undeveloped for 20 years until General Motors built an aircraft plant there during World War II and later a GM Fisher Body plant until the 1970s. On June 9, 2016, the City of Euclid and the Euclid Landmarks Commission dedicated an Ohio Historical Marker at the Euclid Police Mini-Station on HGR Industrial Surplus’ property at 20001 Euclid Avenue, Euclid, Ohio, to formally recognize the site at the center of the U.S. Supreme Court case.

See also
Grape Bay Ltd v Attorney-General of Bermuda [1999] UKPC 43

Notes

References
Wolfe, Michael Allan (2008). The Zoning of America: Euclid v. Ambler. Lawrence, University Press of Kansas.

External links

 Village of Euclid v. Ambler Realty Co. Case Brief by 4 Law School

1926 in United States case law
United States Supreme Court cases
United States Supreme Court cases of the Taft Court
United States land use case law
Zoning in the United States
Euclid, Ohio
Takings Clause case law